Andrew Barclay Sons & Co., currently operating as Brodie Engineering, is a builder of steam and later fireless and diesel locomotives. The company's history dates to foundation of an engineering workshop in 1840 in Kilmarnock, Scotland.

After a long period of operation the company was acquired by the Hunslet group in 1972 and renamed Hunslet-Barclay; in 2007 the company changed hands after bankruptcy becoming Brush-Barclay as part of the FKI Group. In 2011 Brush Traction and Brush-Barclay were acquired from FKI by Wabtec. The site was acquired by Brodie Engineering Ltd in July 2020.

History 

Born in 1814, Andrew Barclay was only 25 years of age when he set up a partnership with Thomas McCulloch to manufacture mill shafts in Kilmarnock, East Ayrshire, Scotland. It was only a couple of years later that he branched out on his own to manufacture his patented gas lamps. In 1847 he set up workshops specializing in the manufacture of winding engines for the local coal mining industry.  However, the money from the gas lamp patent sale was never paid and sequestration of the company came the following year.

By 1859 Barclay had recovered from this setback and his newly formed company produced its first locomotive. Sometime around 1871 Andrew Barclay set up a second locomotive building business known as Barclays & Co.  He had set up this company for his younger brother, John, and his four sons.  This business remaining closely associated with Andrew Barclay.  Again not all went well and the companies were declared bankrupt in 1874 and 1882 respectively.  Four years after this latest collapse, Andrew Barclay's business was relaunched as Andrew Barclay Sons & Co.  Later Barclays & Co was also revived. Further difficulties arose.  In 1892 the firm became a limited liability company as Andrew Barclay Sons & Co., Ltd. Just two years later Andrew was removed from control of the company which bore his name by its shareholders. Barclay sued the company for unpaid wages, a matter which was settled out of court 5 years later.

In 1930 the company bought the business of John Cochrane (Barrhead) Ltd, engine makers and in 1963 it acquired the goodwill of the North British Locomotive Company, Glasgow.

Hunslet-Barclay

In 1972 the company was acquired by the Leeds-based Hunslet Group of companies and its name was changed in 1989 to Hunslet-Barclay Ltd. As such, it operated six ex-British Rail Class 20 diesels to provide motive power for weed-killing trains used on the national rail network. Its manufacturing output in this period included eight additional centre trailer cars for the Glasgow Subway, which were delivered in 1992.

The locomotive interests of Hunslet-Barclay were bought by LH Group, Staffordshire on 31 December 2003, with Hunslet-Barclay at Kilmarnock continuing in the business of design, manufacture and refurbishment of multiple units, rolling stock, bogies and wheel-sets.

Some Barclay locomotives were supplied through Lennox Lange, who acted as an agent for Barclay.

Brush-Barclay

After going into financial administration in 2007 the company was acquired by the locomotive builder Brush Traction of Loughborough through its parent, the FKI Group.  It was renamed Brush-Barclay.

Wabtec Rail Scotland
On 28 February 2011, Wabtec announced that it had acquired Brush Traction for US$31 million. The Kilmarnock works became Wabtec Rail Scotland.

Brodie Engineering

Following closure and sale of the site by Wabtec, Kilmarnock firm Brodie Engineering acquired the site at Caledonia Works in 2020, and now operates two facilities within Kilmarnock, with the other being at the Bonnyton Rail Depot within the Bonnyton Industrial Estate.

Products

Saddle tanks
The company was noted for constructing simple robust locomotives, chiefly for industrial use, and many of its products survive in use on heritage railways, over 100 in Britain.  A typical product would be an 0-4-0 with squared-off saddle tank.

Fireless locomotives
Barclay was the largest builder of fireless locomotives in Britain, building 114 of them between 1913 and 1961. They were used in munitions factories during WW1, and the closure of the Gretna munitions factory at the end of WW1 saw an 0-4-0 Barclay fireless loco of 2 foot gauge, and two 0-6-0 Barclay fireless locos of standard-gauge up for tender.  Few fireless locomotives are seen in action today.  This is due to the low power of the locomotives, the long time needed to charge a locomotive from cold and the low steam pressures available for charging. Perhaps the only exception was "Lord Ashfield" (Andrew Barclay works no. 1989 of 1930) at the Museum of Science and Industry in Manchester that ran for a while in the 1990s sharing a steam supply with the stationary exhibits in their exhibition hall.

Diesel locomotives
The company built diesel shunting locomotives for industry and for British Rail. Classes included British Rail Class D2/5, British Rail Class 01 and British Rail Class 06.

Export
Over 80 Andrew Barclay locomotives were supplied to railways in Ireland (Irish Turf Board/Bord na Móna), Australia, New Zealand, Fiji and Sri Lanka (Sri Lanka Port Authority).

Preservation

A large number of various ABS&Co locomotives have been preserved, proving popular on many Heritage Railways and Railway Centres, as listed below.

Standard Gauge

Steam Locomotives
No' 699 "Swanscombe" - Preserved and running at the Buckinghamshire Railway Centre, Quainton Road in Buckinghamshire
No' 776 "Firefly" - Preserved and under restoration on the Northampton and Lamport Railway in Northampton.
No' 782 "Kinlet" - Preserved and on display at Blists Hill Victorian Town
No' 807 "Bon Accord" - Preserved and running on the Royal Deeside Railway in Scotland
No' 826 - Built in 1898. The buyer was Davis & Soper of London, presumably an agent for “The Corporation of the City of Cape Town” (Municipality). Preserved and on display on Table Mountain in South Africa.  
No' 880 Crane Tank "Glenfield No' 1" - Preserved and currently awaiting restoration at the Ribble Steam Railway in Lancashire
No' 885 - Preserved and awaiting restoration at the Cambrian Heritage Railway in Oswestry, Shropshire
No' 945 "Annie" - Preserved and currently under overhaul at the Whitwell & Reepham Railway in Norfolk
No' 1015 "Horden" - Preserved and currently under restoration at Tanfield Railway in County Durham, North-East England 
No' 1047 "Storefield" - Preserved and running at the East Anglian Railway Museum in Essex
No' 1142 NCB "No' 29" - Preserved and undergoing restoration by the Shed 47 railway restoration group in Scotland 
No' 1147 "John Howe" - Preserved and on Display on the Ribble Steam Railway in Lancashire
No' 1116 Dalemellington "No' 16" - Preserved and on Display at the Scottish Industrial Railway Centre in Scotland
No' 1175 NCB "No' 8 Dardanelles" - Preserved and on Display at Polkemmet Country Park in Scotland
No' 1193 Lady Victoria Colliery "No' 6" - Preserved and awaiting restoration at the Tanfield Railway in County Durham, North-East England 
No' 1219 "Caledonia Works" - Preserved and running on the West Somerset Railway in Somerset
No' 1223 "Colin McAndrew" - Preserved and on Display on the Mountsorrel Railway in Leicestershire
No' 1245 - Preserved and running on the Lakeside & Haverthwaite Railway in Cumbria
No' 1260 "Forester" - Preserved and undergoing restoration on the Pontypool & Blaenavon Railway in Wales
No' 1338 Dalmellington Iron Co. "No' 17" - Preserved and awaiting a major overhaul at the Llangollen Railway in North-East Wales
No’ 1385 “Rosyth No. 1” - Preserved and running on the Pontypool and Blaenavon Railway in Wales
No' 1398 "Lord Fisher" - Preserved and running at the Yeovil Railway Centre in Somerset 
No' 1458 "No' 3 Lady Victoria" - Preserved and awaiting restoration at the Bo'ness & Kinneil Railway in Scotland
No' 1472 "Bluebottle" - Preserved and on Display at the Bressingham Steam and Gardens in Norfolk
No' 1473 "Sir Charles" - Preserved and on Display at the Swansea Industrial and Maritime Museum in Wales
No' 1477 - Preserved and on Static Display at the Buckinghamshire Railway Centre 
No' 1550 "Sir James" - Now on Static Display at HM Factory, Gretna
No' 1572 Heysham "No' 1 Lancaster" - Preserved and awaiting restoration at Carnforth in Lancashire
No' 1598 "Efficient" - Preserved and on Display at the Ribble Steam Railway in Lancashire
No' 1605 "W38 Ajax" - Preserved and on Display on the Isle of Wight Steam Railway on the Isle of Wight
No' 1614 Dalmellington "No' 19" - Preserved and awaiting restoration at the Scottish Industrial Railway Centre in Scotland
No' 1619 NCB "Toto No' 6" - Preserved and undergoing restoration at the Mangapps Railway Museum in Essex
No' 1659 "No' 32" - Preserved and undergoing overhaul at the Cromford and High Peak Railway in Derbyshire
No' 1680 "Nora No' 5" - Preserved and currently static at the Big Pit National Coal Museum, in Wales
No' 1719 "Lady Nan" - Preserved and running on the East Somerset Railway in Somerset
No' 1823 "Harry" - Preserved and awaiting restoration at the Pontypool & Blaenavon Railway in Wales
No' 1833 "Niddrie" - Preserved and under restoration at the Ribble Steam Railway in Lancashire
No' 1863 - Preserved and running at the Caledonian Railway (Brechin) in Scotland
No' 1865 "Alexander" - Preserved and on Display at the Ribble Steam Railway in Lancashire
No' 1874 "Maite" - Preserved at the Basque Railway Museum in Azpeitia, Spain
No' 1875 Crane Tank "Stanton No' 24" - Preserved and on Display inside the Matthew Kirtley Museum, on the Midland Railway – Butterley in Derbyshire
No' 1876 - Preserved and on Display at the Sittingbourne and Kemsley Light Railway in Kent
No' 1889 Aberdeen Gas Works "No' 3" - Preserved and on Display at the Grampian Transport Museum in Scotland
No' 1890 Granton Gasworks "Forth No' 10" - Preserved and running on the Fife Heritage Railway in Scotland  
No' 1927 B.C.G.D "No' 1" - Preserved and on Display at the Bury Transport Museum in Greater Manchester
No' 1931 - Preserved and running at the Rutland Railway Museum near Leicestershire
No' 1937 Clyde's Mill "No' 3" - Preserved and on Display at the Bo'ness & Kinneil Railway in Scotland
No' 1950 "Heysham No. 2" - Preserved and on Display at the Ribble Steam Railway in Lancashire
No' 1952 Shell Refining "No' 8" - Preserved and running at the Scottish Industrial Railway Centre in Scotland 
No' 1964 "Spitfire" - Preserved and running on the Lincolnshire Wolds Railway in Lincolnshire
No' 1969 "JN Derbyshire" - Preserved and on Display at the Ribble Steam Railway in Lancashire
No' 1984 "Boots No' 1" - Preserved and undergoing restoration at the West Somerset Railway in Somerset 
No' 1989 "Lord Ashfield" - Preserved and awaiting overhaul at the Bo'ness & Kinneil Railway in Scotland
No' 2008 "Boots No' 2" - Preserved and on Display inside the Matthew Kirtley Museum, on the Midland Railway – Butterley in Derbyshire
No' 2015 "Tom Parry" Preserved and awaiting restoration at Pontypool & Blaenavon Railway in Wales
No' 2017 "Braeriach No' 17" - Preserved and awaiting overhaul at the Strathspey Railway in Scotland
No' 2020 Balmenach Distillery "No' 2" - Preserved and awaiting overhaul at the Strathspey Railway in Scotland
No' 2043 NCB "No' 6" - Preserved and running at the Bo'ness and Kinneil Railway in Scotland
No' 2047 "No' 705" - Preserved and running on the Plym Valley Railway in Devon
No' 2046 British Aluminium Co. "No' 3" - Preserved and awaiting restoration at the Bo'ness & Kinneil Railway in Scotland
No’ 2068 “No’ 20” ex Wemyss - Preserved and awaiting overhaul at the Bo'ness & Kinneil Railway in Scotland
No’ 2069 “Little Barford”
No' 2073 "Dailuaine No' 1" - Preserved and on display at Aberfeldy distillery in Scotland
No' 2074 "Llantarnam Abbey" - Preserved and undergoing restoration at the Pontypool & Blaenavon Railway in Wales
No' 2086 Royal Ordinance Factory "Drake" - Preserved and on Display at Andrew Barclay Railway Centre in Scotland
No' 2088 "Sir Thomas Royden" - Preserved and running at the Rutland Railway Museum near Leicestershire 
No' 2107 "Harlaxton" - Preserved and running on the Caledonian Railway (Brechin) in Scotland
No' 2127 Crane Tank "No' 6" - Preserved and currently on display in the museum at the Bo'ness & Kinneil Railway in Scotland
No' 2134 British Gypsum "W.T.T." - Preserved and stored at Carnforth in Lancashire
No' 2138 "Swordfish" - Preserved and running on the Swindon & Cricklade Railway in Wiltshire
No' 2139 "Salmon" - Preserved and awaiting 10-year overhaul on the Royal Deeside Railway in Scotland
No' 2157 "Fambridge" - Preserved and running on the Mangapps Railway Museum in Essex
No' 2168 "Edmundsons" - Preserved and under overhaul at the Rushden Transport Museum in Northamptonshire
No' 2183 "Earl David No' 15" - Preserved and running on the Avon Valley Railway in Gloucestershire 
No' 2199 - Preserved and running at the Whitwell & Reepham Railway in Norfolk
No' 2201 "Victory" - Preserved and awaiting restoration at the Pontypool & Blaenavon Railway in Wales
No' 2217 "Henry Ellison" - Preserved and running on the Ecclesbourne Valley Railway in Derbyshire
No' 2219 NCB "No' 17" - Preserved and awaiting overhaul at the Prestongrange Museum in Scotland
No' 2220 "Invicta" - Preserved and under restoration at the Chatham Historic Dockyard Railway in Kent
No' 2221 - Preserved and awaiting restoration at the Dean Forest Railway in Gloucestershire
No' 2226 "Katie" - Preserved and awaiting a major overhaul at the Churnet Valley Railway in Staffordshire
No' 2230 Cook and Nuttall "No' 1 Hurricane" - preserved and undergoing overhaul at Carnforth in Lancashire
No' 2238 BP Chemicals - Preserved and on Display at the Welsh Industrial and Maritime Museum in Wales
No' 2239 "Mr Therm" - Preserved and on static display at Seaton Park in Aberdeen, Scotland
No' 2243 - Preserved and on Static Display at the Buckinghamshire Railway Centre
No' 2244 NCB "No' 10" - Preserved and running at the Scottish Industrial Railway Centre in Scotland
No' 2248 "Albert" - Preserved and under overhaul on the Plym Valley Railway in Devon
No' 2258 "Tiny" - Preserved and on Display at the Keighley and Worth Valley Railway in Yorkshire
No' 2260 NCB "No' 23" - Preserved and on Display at the Scottish Industrial Railway Centre in Scotland
No' 2264 "Fife Flyer No' 6" - Preserved and running at the Cambrian Heritage Railway in Oswestry, Shropshire
No' 2268 Glaxo Laboratories "Glaxo" - Preserved and awaiting restoration at Carnforth
No' 2274 NCB "No' 22" - Preserved and awaiting overhaul on the Bowes Railway, Tyne & Wear, North-East England
No' 2284 NCB "No' 21" - Preserved and awaiting overhaul at the Lady Victoria Colliery in Scotland 
No' 2292 NCB "No' 21" -Preserved and undergoing restoration at the Fife Heritage Railway in Scotland
No' 2296 NCB "No' 17" - Preserved and undergoing restoration at the Scottish Vintage Bus Museum in Scotland 
No' 2315 "Lady Ingrid" - Preserved and currently being overhauled at the Spa Valley Railway in Kent/Sussex
No' 2320 NCB "No' 22" - Preserved and under overhaul at the Embsay & Bolton Abbey Steam Railway, in North Yorkshire 
No' 2323 - preserved and under restoration at Northampton and Lamport Railway  in Northamptonshire
No' 2333 "David" - Preserved and under overhaul at the Lakeside and Haverthwaite Railway in the Lake District
No' 2335 NCB "No' 24" - Preserved and on Display at the Bo'ness & Kinneil Railway in Scotland
No' 2343 "British Gypsum No'4" - Preserved and currently awaiting restoration at the Ribble Steam Railway in Lancashire
No' 2350 "Belvoir" - Preserved and awaiting restoration at the Rutland Railway Museum near Leicestershire 
No' 2352 GEPG Goldington "No. 67 Hong Kong Flyer" - Preserved and undergoing restoration at the Tanat Valley Railway in Shropshire
No' 2354 "Richard Trevithick" - Preserved and undergoing overhaul on the Swindon & Cricklade Railway in Wiltshire
No' 2358 NCB "No' 25" - Preserved and awaiting restoration at the Scottish Industrial Railway Centre in Scotland 
No' 2360 "Brian Harrison No' 3" - Preserved and running on the Ecclesbourne Valley Railway in Derbyshire
No' 2361 "W.S.T" - Preserved and awaiting an overhaul on the Bowes Railway in Tyne & Wear, North-East England
No' 2368 NCB "No' 1" - Preserved and awaiting restoration at the Scottish Industrial Railway Centre in Scotland 
No' 2369 - Preserved and under overhaul at the Appleby Frodingham Railway Preservation Society in Lincolnshire
No' 2373 Imperial Paper Mills "No' 1" - preserved and on Display at the National Railway Museum in York
No' ? Fireless ex CEGB Castle Meads Power Station, Gloucester − Preserved and displayed at Gloucester Docks.

Diesel Locomotives

No' 333 "John Peel" - Preserved and operates at the East Anglia Railway Museum, in Essex.
No' 343 - Preserved and on display, at the Bo'ness and Kinneil Railway in Scotland.
No' 347 "Powfoot No' 1" - Preserved and operational at the Scottish Industrial Railway Centre.
No' 349 - Preserved and operates on the Colne Valley Railway, in Essex.
No' 354 - Preserved and operational on the Lavender Line, in Sussex.
No' 357/WD42 "Overlord" - Preserved and operational, at the Chatham Historic Dockyard Railway, in Kent.
No' 358/WD 70043 "Gumpy" - Preserved and operational, at the Avon Valley Railway, in Gloucestershire.
No' 363/WD 70048 - Preserved and operational, at the Rushden, Higham and Wellingborough Railway in Northamptonshire.
No' 369/Army 235 - Preserved and operational, at the Isle of Wight Steam Railway.
No' 376 "Princess Margaret" - Preserved and undergoing overhaul, at Tyseley Locomotive Works in Birmingham. 
DM No' 399 - Preserved and undergoing overhaul at the Scottish Industrial Railway Centre.
DM No' 400 "Duke of Edinburgh" "Bardon No 28" - Preserved and operated by Georail Services Ltd in Cheshire. 
No' 415 - Preserved and operational on the Keith and Dufftown Railway.
No' 416 - Preserved and currently being overhauled on the Midland Railway - Butterley in Derbyshire.
No' 422 "Hot Wheels" - Preserved, but currently stored out of use on the Battlefield Line Railway in Leicestershire.
No' 440 "Meaford No' 2" - Preserved and operational at the Embsay and Bolton Abbey Steam Railway, in North Yorkshire. 
No' 441 - Preserved and currently undergoing repairs on the Midland Railway - Butterley in Derbyshire.
No' 446 "Kingswood" - Preserved and operational on the Helston Railway, in Cornwall.
No' 472 - Preserved and stored out of use at the Summerlee, Museum of Scottish Industrial Life.
No' 486 "Clive" No' 4 - Preserved and currently being overhauled at the Foxfield Railway, in Staffordshire. 
No' 499 - Operational at W.H. Davis in Shirebrook.
No' 506 - Stored at C.F. Booth's scrapyard in Rotherham.
No' 517 "Power of Enterprise" - Preserved, though currently stored out of use on the Strathspey Railway.
No' 552 "F.G.F. British Gypsum" - Preserved and on display, at the Bo'ness and Kinneil Railway in Scotland.
DH No' 578 - Preserved and operates as a shunter on the West Somerset Railway.
DH No' 579 - Preserved and operates as a shunter on the West Somerset Railway.
No' 594 "Big Momma" - Preserved and stored out of use, at the Battlefield Line Railway in Leicestershire.
No' 615 - Preserved and currently at the Aln Valley Railway, in Northumberland.
No' 421697 - Preserved and currently awaiting cosmetic restoration at the Scottish Industrial Railway Centre.

Narrow Gauge
'Steam Locomotives'
No' 2 LM44 - Preserved and running on the Stradbally Woodland Railway in Ireland.
No' 3 Darent - Preserved and running on the Kempton Steam Railway in Hounslow, West End of London.
No' 3 Shane - Preserved and running on the Giant's Causeway and Bushmills Railway in Ireland. 
No' 4 Doll - Preserved and running on the Leighton Buzzard Light Railway in Bedfordshire.
No' 6 Douglas - Preserved and running on the Talyllyn Railway in Wales.
No' 8 Dougal - Preserved and running on the Welshpool and Llanfair Light Railway in Mid-Wales.
No' 9 Jack - Preserved and running somewhere in Reading, Berkshire. 
Cegin - Preserved and undergoing restoration at the Statfold Barn Railway in Staffordshire.
Glyder - Preserved and running at the Beamish Museum.
Gertrude - Preserved and under overhaul on the Leighton Buzzard Light Railway in Bedfordshire.
No' 1181 - Preserved and under restoration at the Silver Stream Railway in the Hutt Valley, New Zealand.
No' 1222 - Converted to diesel power by A & G Price for Westfield Freezing Company. Preserved at Ngongotaha, near Rotorua.
No' 1335 Gear Meat "No' 3" - Preserved and awaiting restoration at the Silver Stream Railway in the Hutt Valley, New Zealand.
No' 1749 PWD "531" - Preserved and running on the Silver Stream Railway in the Hutt Valley, New Zealand.
No' 1894 - In outside storage with the Canterbury Railway Society at Ferrymead Heritage Park in Christchurch, New Zealand.

'Narrow Gauge Diesel Locomotives'
AB554/1970 - Preserved at the Welsh Highland Heritage Railway in Porthmadog.
AB555/1970 - Preserved at the Welsh Highland Heritage Railway in Porthmadog.
AB556/1970 - Preserved and awaiting restoration at the Apedale Valley Light Railway in Staffordshire.
AB557/1970 - Preserved at the Almond Valley Light Railway in West Lothian.
AB560/1971 - Preserved
AB561/1971 - Preserved Ayrshire Railway Preservation Group.

Gallery

See also
Grant, Ritchie and Company - In 1876, there was a disastrous fire at Andrew Barclay's Caledonia works in Kilmarnock. At this point, two employees Thomas Grant and William Ritchie, set up Grant, Ritchie and Company at Townholme Engine Works, Kilmarnock to manufacture steam locomotives.

References

Further reading

External links 

 YouTube video of Kilmarnock Junction, Station and Wabtec Rail works
 Fireless Locomotives
 No.1578 Gertrude
 Locomotive Works Lists 1897-1912

 

Manufacturing companies established in 1840
Companies of Scotland
Barclay
 
Kilmarnock
Wabtec
British companies established in 1840